The legal status of polygamy varies widely around the world. Polygyny is legal in 58 out of nearly 200 sovereign states, the vast majority of them being Muslim-majority countries. Polygyny is illegal in virtually every country but it’s not prohibited in Islam. In several non-Muslim countries in Sub-Saharan Africa and Asia, including India, Philippines, and Singapore, polygyny is only permitted among the Muslim population. Some countries that permit polygamy have restrictions, such as requiring the first wife to give her consent.

In countries that ban polygamy, the offence is commonly called bigamy, though the penalty varies between jurisdictions. In some countries where polygamy is illegal, the prohibition is not enforced.

Countries that recognize polygamous marriages

Africa

  Algeria
  Cameroon
  Chad
  Central African Republic
  Republic of the Congo
  Djibouti
  Egypt
  Eswatini
  Gabon: Both men and women can join in polygamous marriage with the other gender under Gabonese law. In practice, the right to multiple spouses is reserved for men only.
  The Gambia
  Guinea
  Libya
  Kenya: Polygyny legal under legislation passed in 2014.
  Mali
  Mauritania
  Morocco
  Nigeria (only in some states)
  São Tomé and Príncipe
  Senegal
  Somalia
  Somaliland
  South Sudan
  South Africa is recognized for customary marriages. The Supreme Court also ruled that Muslim marriages performed under  Sharia law are valid.
  Sudan
  Togo
  Tanzania
  Uganda
  Zambia

Asia

  Afghanistan
  Bahrain
  Bangladesh
  Bhutan
  Brunei
  Indonesia (except for in the provinces of Maluku, North Maluku, Papua, and West Papua) 
  Iran
  Iraq (except for in Iraqi Kurdistan)
  Jordan
  Kuwait
  Maldives
  Oman
  Qatar
  Palestine
  Saudi Arabia
  Syria (except in Syrian Kurdistan)
  United Arab Emirates
  Yemen

Oceania
  Solomon Islands

Countries that only recognize polygamous marriages for Muslims
Note: These countries are included separately because they have specific legislation aimed only at Muslims.

Asia

  India
 Malaysia
 Philippines, only for "exceptional cases" even among Muslims where a man could provide for their wives with equal companionship.
 Sri Lanka
  Lebanon
  Pakistan

Countries that only recognize polygamous marriages under customary law

Africa
  Botswana
  Lesotho
  Liberia
  Malawi
  Namibia
  Niger
  Nigeria (only in some states): Recognized in all northern Sharia states
  Sierra Leone
  Zimbabwe

Countries that do not recognize polygamous marriages

Africa
Polygamy is more widespread in Africa than in any other continent, being most common in a region known as the "polygamy belt" in West Africa and Central Africa, with the countries estimated to have the highest polygamy prevalence in the world being Burkina Faso, Mali, Gambia, Niger and Nigeria. In the region of sub-Saharan Africa, polygyny is common and deeply rooted in the culture, with 11% of the population of sub-Saharan Africa living in such marriages (25% of the Muslim population and 3% of the Christian population, as of 2019). Polygmous marriages occur, regardless of legality, as the practice is deeply rooted in culture and often supported by Islam in Africa.

  Angola
  Benin
  Burkina Faso
  Burundi
  Cabo Verde
  Democratic Republic of the Congo
  Côte d'Ivoire: Polygamy may be punishable by six months to three years imprisonment, or a fine of CFA 50,000 to CFA 500,000 (US$80 to US$800).
  Eritrea: Illegal since 1977, after 2015 polygamy is punishable with "a definite term of imprisonment of not less than 6 months and not more than 12 months, or a fine of 20,001 – 50,000 Nakfas."
  Equatorial Guinea
  Ghana
  Ethiopia
  Madagascar
  Mauritius
  Mayotte (French territory) (not criminalized): Considered to be de facto illegal since a referendum sponsored by France in March 2009, forcing the island to comply with the French laws. However, pre-existing Muslim marriages are currently still valid.
  Mozambique
  Rwanda
  Seychelles
  Tunisia, where it has been banned since 1956

Americas

  Antigua and Barbuda
  Argentina
  Bahamas
  Barbados
  Belize
  Bolivia
  Brazil: Bigamy is illegal. The marriage of a single individual to more than one other person is prohibited by law as bigamy, which is punishable by two to six years of imprisonment, and is valid for every Brazilian citizen, including naturalized ones. De facto polygamy is not outlawed.
  Canada: All forms of polygamy, and some informal multiple sexual relationships, are illegal under section 293 of the Criminal Code. Bigamy is banned by section 290. However, as of January 2009, no person has been successfully prosecuted, i.e. convicted, in over sixty years. In 2009, two acquittals on polygamy charges, arising out of the town of Bountiful, British Columbia, prompted the government of British Columbia to pose a reference question to the Supreme Court of British Columbia (i.e., the superior trial court).  The reference questions asked if the criminalisation of polygamy was consistent with the Canadian Charter of Rights and Freedoms; and, if so, under what circumstances could people be legally punished for polygamy. In November 2011 the court released its 335-page long decision, which was that the criminal offence of polygamy is indeed constitutional, but that it should not be used to prosecute minors for having taken part in a polygamous marriage. Chief Justice Robert J. Bauman conceded that there is a conflict between this law and some civil rights principles, but stated that there are other and "more important" issues which in this case take precedence. He wrote (as quoted by CBC News): "I have concluded that this case is essentially about harm. More specifically, Parliament's reasoned apprehension of harm arising out of the practice of polygamy. This includes harm to women, to children, to society and the institution of monogamous marriage." Bauman argued that there are cases where the "wives" (who may be rather young; sometimes as young as 12 years) are abducted and abused, but because they believe in faith-promoting polygamy, they are not willing to bring complaints to the authorities. He reasoned that these offences sometimes may be stopped by applying anti-polygamy legislation. The decision was welcomed by the Attorney General of British Columbia, and by a representative for the group Stop Polygamy in Canada. Likewise, according to CBC News, some polyamorous groups in Canada expressed their relief since Bauman had stated that the law shouldn't apply to them unless they decide to formalize their unions. Women's rights were central to the decision.
  Chile
  Colombia
  Costa Rica
  Cuba
  Dominica
  Dominican Republic
  Ecuador
  El Salvador
  Grenada
  Guatemala
  Guyana
  Haiti
  Honduras
  Jamaica
  Mexico
  Nicaragua
  Panama
  Paraguay
  Peru
  St. Kitts and Nevis
  St. Lucia
  St. Vincent and The Grenadines
  Suriname
  Trinidad and Tobago

  United States: Polygamy is illegal in all 50 states, De facto polygamy is illegal under federal law, the Edmunds Act.  Utah, in February 2020, reduced polygamy to the status of a traffic ticket; nevertheless recognizing polygamous unions is illegal under  the Constitution of Utah. Polygamy is illegal federally according to the Edmunds Act.
  Uruguay
  Venezuela

Asia
As in Africa, polygamy continues to be practiced in parts of Asia, regardless of laws.
  Armenia 
  Azerbaijan 
  India
  Nepal
  China: Polygamy is illegal under the Civil code passed in 2020, which replaced a similar 1950 and 1980 prohibition. 
  Hong Kong: Polygamy ended with the passing of the Marriage Act of 1971 when the country was a crown colony under the former flag . Previous unions entered into under customary law are recognised in some situations.
  Israel: Polygamy has been banned for all confessional communities since at least 1959. Polygamy was criminalized in 1977, but the law is not consistently enforced and polygamy is still practiced by Negev Bedouins.
  Japan
  Kazakhstan: Polygamous marriages are not recognized, but the practice is decriminalized, with Kazakhstan being the only Central Asian country to have decriminalized the practice (in 1998, when the new criminal code no longer provided for such an offense).
  Kyrgyzstan
  Mongolia
  Myanmar
  South Korea
  Taiwan (Polygamy is illegal )
  Tajikistan
  Turkey (Polygamy was criminalized in 1926 with the adoption of the Turkish Civil Code, part of Atatürk's secularist reforms. Penalties for polygamy are imprisonment of up to 5 years.) Turkey has long been known for its promotion of secularism, and has introduced measures establishing stricter bars against polygamy; these were passed by the ruling moderate Islamist AK Party as well. In March 2009, AK Parti effectively banned polygamists from entering or living in the country.
  Turkmenistan
  Uzbekistan
  Vietnam
 Cambodia
 Laos
 Russia: Polygamous marriages are not recognized in the Russian Federation. The Family Code of Russia states that a marriage can only be contracted between a man and a woman, neither of whom is married to someone else. Furthermore, Russia does not recognize polygamous marriages that had been contracted in other countries. However, neither bigamy nor de facto polygamy are criminalized.
 Thailand
 Timor-Leste

Europe
 Albania
 Andorra
 Belarus
 Bosnia and Herzegovina
 European Union: Polygamy is illegal in all 27 states. In Bulgaria, polygamy is illegal and punishable with up to three years imprisonment. In Finland, the official prosecutor is obliged to take all cases to a court where more than two persons are married to each other and such relationships cease to exist after the court has decided it. Polygamic marriages performed abroad may be recognized only on narrow occasions, for instance in child custody matters. In France, polygamy is illegal under Article 433-20 of he Penal Code and punishable by one year's imprisonment and a fine of €45,000. In Germany, polygamy is illegal, legally punishable with fine or prison time up to three years. Polygamous marriages contracted abroad are legal, however, the German authorities announced plans to close this legal loophole by making it a barrier to naturalization. In Ireland, the Catholic Church in Ireland allowed someone with a church annulment but no civil annulment to remarry in church; such a marriage was legally null and bigamous but no prosecutions were brought. The practice ended after the 1996 legalisation of divorce. In 2017, the Supreme Court ruled that if someone had two legal marriages abroad, only the first was legal in Ireland, though 'that did not necessarily mean [the second] marriage "can never have legal consequences [in Ireland]"'. In the Netherlands, a marriage between more than two individuals is prohibited; however, a samenlevingscontract may include more than two partners. It legally accepts immigrants who are in such a union from a country where it is legal; e.g. if a man with two wives immigrates to The Netherlands, all three will be legally recognized. In Romania, bigamy, defined as marriage conducted by a person who is already married, is punishable by up to 2 years in prison or fine. Knowingly marrying a married person is punishable by up to 1 year in prison or by fine. In Sweden, a person who is already married is not permitted to enter into another marriage. In the past, Sweden generally recognized polygamous marriages performed abroad. However, the Swedish government decided to task an inquiry chair with reviewing how to prevent recognition of foreign polygamous marriages in Sweden; Deputy Minister for Justice, Heléne Fritzon stating that "Polygamous marriages should not be recognised in Sweden and we need to review the existing legal loophole that makes it possible. Polygamous marriages undermine gender equality and, according to the UN, it can have serious emotional and financial consequences". Since 2021, Sweden no longer recognizes foreign polygamous marriages, save in exceptional circumstances.
 Georgia
 Iceland
 Kosovo
 Liechtenstein
 Moldova
 Monaco
 Montenegro
 North Macedonia
 Norway
 Russia: Polygamous marriages are not recognized in Russia. The Family Code of Russia states that a marriage can only be contracted between a man and a woman, neither of whom is married to someone else. Furthermore, Russia does not recognize polygamous marriages that had been contracted in other countries. However, neither bigamy nor de facto polygamy are criminalized.
 San Marino
 Serbia
 Switzerland: Polygamy is illegal by law. But polygamous marriage conducted in another country may be accepted or rejected on a case-by-case basis.
 Ukraine
 United Kingdom: Foreign polygamous marriages grant some welfare benefits only, but this is being phased out with the introduction of Universal Credit. Polygamy is treated as bigamy if a second marriage (or civil partnership) is contracted in the United Kingdom.  No legal recognition is extended to spouses of subsequent marriages after the first marriage is recognised even when subsequent marriages are contracted abroad.
 Vatican City (Holy See)

Oceania
 Australia: Polygamous marriages cannot be performed in Australia, but polygamous relationships are still common within some indigenous Australian communities. Polygamous marriages entered into abroad are recognised for limited purposes only.
 Fiji
 Kiribati
 Marshall Islands
 Micronesia
 Nauru
 New Zealand: Polygamous marriages cannot be performed in New Zealand, but are permissible if they are legally performed in a country that permits polygamy.
 Palau
 Papua New Guinea
 Samoa
 Tonga
 Tuvalu
 Vanuatu

Current legislation
In most countries, a person who marries a person while still being lawfully married to another commits bigamy, a criminal offence, though penalties vary between jurisdictions. Besides, the second and subsequent marriages are considered legally null and void.

The United Kingdom, Australia, and New Zealand permit some benefits for spouses of polygamous marriages performed abroad. In the past, Sweden used to recognize polygamous marriages performed abroad; but
since 2021, Sweden no longer recognizes such marriages, save in exceptional circumstances. In Switzerland polygamous marriages conducted abroad may be accepted or rejected on a case-by-case basis; see § Europe. 

In Canada, both bigamy (article 290 of the Criminal code of Canada)) and de facto polygamy (article 293 of the Criminal Code)  are illegal, but there are provisions in the property law of at least the Canadian province of Saskatchewan that consider the possibility of de facto multiple marriage-like situations (e.g. if an already married person enters into a second common-law relationship situation without first obtaining a legal divorce from their existing spouse). 

The vast majority of sovereign states with a Muslim-majority population recognize polygamous marriages: these states span from the West Africa to Southeast Asia, with the exceptions of Turkey, Tunisia, Albania, Kosovo and Central Asian countries. 

Predominantly Christian nations usually do not allow polygamy, with a handful of exceptions such as the Republic of the Congo, Uganda, and Zambia.

Almost a dozen countries that do not permit polygamous civil marriages recognize polygamous marriages under customary law. All the northern states in Nigeria governed by Islamic Sharia law recognize polygamous marriages. The autonomous regions of Somaliland and Puntland in northern Somalia also recognize polygamy, as does the country's Transitional Federal Government itself, since the country is governed by Sharia law. The recently independent country of Southern Sudan also recognizes polygamy.

Polyandry is de facto the norm in rural areas of Tibet, although it is illegal under Chinese family law. Polygamy continues in Bhutan in various forms as it has since ancient times.  It is also found in parts of Nepal, despite its formal illegality in the country.

Debates of legalizing polygamous marriages continue in Central Asian countries.

International law
In 2000, the United Nations Human Rights Committee reported that polygamy violates the International Covenant on Civil and Political Rights (ICCPR), citing concerns that the lack of "equality of treatment with regard to the right to marry" meant that polygamy, restricted to polygyny in practice, violates the dignity of women and should be outlawed.  Specifically, the reports to UN Committees have noted violations of the ICCPR due to these inequalities and reports to the General Assembly of the UN have recommended it be outlawed.

Some countries where polygamy is legal are not signatories of ICCPR, including Saudi Arabia, United Arab Emirates, Qatar, Oman, Malaysia, Brunei and South Sudan; so that ICCPR does not apply to these countries. It has been argued by the Department of Justice of Canada that polygyny is a violation of international human rights law.

Notable legislation 
The tables below cover recent pieces of legislation that have been either debated, proposed or voted on; all of which concerns a form of polygamous union.

To permit polygamy

To outlaw polygamy

See also
 Polygamy
 List of polygamy court cases

References 

Polygamy law